Christian Freckmann (born 18 July 1993) is a German sport shooter.

He participated at the 2018 ISSF World Shooting Championships, winning a medal.

References

External links

Living people
1993 births
German male sport shooters
ISSF pistol shooters
People from Sondershausen
Sportspeople from Thuringia
21st-century German people